Eva Haifa Giraud (born 1984) is a cultural and critical theorist and a scholar of media studies and feminist science studies whose work concerns activism and non-anthropocentric theory. She is presently a senior lecturer in the Department of Media, Communications and Creative Practice at Keele University. Her 2019 monograph What Comes After Entanglement? Activism, Anthropocentrism, and an Ethics of Exclusion was published by Duke University Press; her second book, Veganism: Politics, Practice and Theory, will be published in 2021 by Bloomsbury.

Biography
Giraud read for an Master of Arts (MA) in English Literature at the University of Edinburgh from 2002–2006, and then went on to read for an MA (2006–7) and PhD (2007–11) in Critical Theory at the Centre for Critical Theory, University of Nottingham. Her doctoral thesis was entitled Articulating Animal Rights: Activism, Networks and Anthropocentrism. She worked at Nottingham for three years, before joining the Keele University in 2014. Her research concerns the use of media by activists (including animal activists, food activists, environmental activists, and anti-racist activists); non-anthropocentric theory exploring how to live in ways that reject human exceptionalism; and online hate speech.

In 2019, Giraud published a monograph entitled What Comes After Entanglement? Activism, Anthropocentrism, and an Ethics of Exclusion with Duke University Press. In the book, she addresses the theoretical idea of entanglement, which cautions theorists and activists to "avoid proposing simple solutions to the world’s complex problems". Giraud explores case studies of activism including anti-McDonald's campaigning, anti-G8 campaigning, the SPEAK campaign, and food activism in Nottingham, arguing that there is a tension between, on the one hand, theoretical work on entanglement, and, on the other, the political practice of activists. She argues for an "ethics of exclusion", which recognises that certain ways of being are inevitably foreclosed by decisions made, and that decisions sometimes have to be made. She thus challenges the charges made by certain theorists that activist decision-making essentialist and insufficiently attentive to the world's complexity; her descriptions of protest ecologies and their everyday practices of decision-making and labour organisations "trouble the notion" of staying with the trouble. One reviewer said that the book would be valuable for scholars of a wide range of disciplines; another drew attention to the ongoing conversation that Giraud was conducting with Donna Haraway, a major influence on Giraud's work; and a third argued that one of the book's major contributions was emphasising the difference between animal studies and critical animal studies.

Giraud's second book, Veganism: Politics, Practice and Theory, will be published by Bloomsbury in 2021.

Selected works
Elizabeth Poole and Eva Giraud, eds. (2019). Right Wing Populism and Mediated Activism: Creative Responses & Counter-narrative. London: Open Library of Humanities.
Eva Giraud (2019). What Comes After Entanglement? Activism, Anthropocentrism and an Ethics of Exclusion. Durham, NC: Duke University Press.
Eva Giraud (2021). Veganism: Politics, Practice and Theory. London: Bloomsbury.

References

External links

Eva Giraud at Keele University
Eva Giraud at Humanities Commons
Eva Giraud on Twitter

Living people
1984 births
Alumni of the University of Edinburgh
Alumni of the University of Nottingham
Academics of Keele University
Critical theorists
Science and technology studies scholars
Feminist theorists